"Don't Blame the Party (Mode)" is a song by Dutch dance duo Bingo Players, featuring vocals from Heather Bright. It was first released on 5 December 2011 as the instrumental song "Mode" on Beatport through their label Hysteria. "Don't Blame the Party (Mode)" was released in the Netherlands as a digital download on 13 February 2012 and it has charted at #55 there and at #54 in Belgium. The  remixes with Firebeatz and Qulinez were released on 25 June 2012.

Track listing

Chart performance

Release history

References

2012 singles
Bingo Players songs
Songs written by Heather Bright
Songs written by Maarten Hoogstraten
Songs written by Paul Bäumer (musician)
2011 songs